Harry Francis Prevost Battersby (18621949) most well known as H. F. P. Battersby was a poet, novelist journalist and psychical researcher, who published under the name Francis Prevost.

Biography
Battersby was born in 1862, the son of a major-general. He graduated with distinction from the Royal Military College at Sandhurst and initially joined the Royal Irish Rifles before moving into journalism. He served as the Boer War correspondent for the Morning Post. In 1909, he married Frances Muriel Saunders. He saw active service again during the First World War.

Works

Poems
Melilot (1886)
Fires of Greenwood (1887)

Novels and short fiction
Rust of Gold (1895)
The Avenging Hour (1896)
False Dawn (1897)
In The Web of War (1900)
The Plague of the Heart (1902)

Plays
The Way of War (1902)
Voice of Duty (1904)

Translator
Tolstoi's Christ's Christianity and What to Do

Parapsychology
Psychic Certainties (1930)
Man Outside Himself (1942)

References
Prevost, Francis, in The Oxford Companion to Edwardian Fiction
Prevost, Francis, in The Stanford Companion to Victorian Fiction (ed. John Sutherland)
A Short Biographical Dictionary of English Literature by John W. Cousin (John William Cousin), 1849–1910.

1862 births
1949 deaths
British poets
British war correspondents
Graduates of the Royal Military College, Sandhurst
Parapsychologists
Royal Ulster Rifles officers
British male poets